The Camino Del Rey Association is a high school athletic league that is part of the CIF Southern Section.  It is an amalgamation of the Camino Real League, the Del Rey League and the Santa Fe League.  Members are generally the Catholic schools located in Los Angeles County.

Members
 Bellarmine-Jefferson High School
 Bishop Amat Memorial High School	
 Bishop Montgomery High School
 Cantwell-Sacred Heart of Mary High School
 Cathedral High School 
 Don Bosco Technical Institute (Bosco Tech)
 La Salle High School
 Mary Star of the Sea High School
 Pomona Catholic High School
 Salesian High School
 Junípero Serra High School
 St. Anthony High School
 St. Bernard High School
 St. Genevieve High School
 St. Joseph High School
 St. Mary's Academy
 Saint Monica Catholic High School
 St. Paul High School 
 St. Pius X / St. Matthias Academy
 Verbum Dei High School (football only)

References

CIF Southern Section leagues
Catholic sports organizations